Gordon Barker (6 July 1931 – 10 February 2006) was an English first-class cricketer who played for Essex. Born in Yorkshire, Barker was a right-handed opening batsman and made his Essex debut in 1954 against the touring Canadians, scoring a century.

Barker passed 1,000 runs in a season every year from 1955 to 1967 with a best of 1,741 runs in 1960. He finished his career with 21,893 runs for Essex.

Football career
Barker also played professional football, and made 57 league appearances for Southend United between 1954 and 1959.

References

External links
 Cricinfo profile

1931 births
2006 deaths
English cricketers
Essex cricketers
English footballers
Association football wingers
English Football League players
Bishop Auckland F.C. players
Southend United F.C. players
Chelmsford City F.C. players
Players cricketers
Marylebone Cricket Club cricketers